The 2021 MotoAmerica Supersport Championship season was the 7th season of the supersport class of motorcycle racing within the MotoAmerica series. Richie Escalante entered the season as the defending champion, picking up his first MotoAmerica supersport title in 2020. However, the 9-round season concluded with Sean Dylan Kelly picking up his first MotoAmerica supersport title. This was enough to secure Kelly a move to Moto2 for 2022.

Calendar and results

Teams and riders

Championship standings

Scoring system
Points are awarded to the top fifteen finishers. A rider has to finish the race to earn points.

References 

MotoAmerica
MotoAmerica